The BellSouth Mobility 320 was a NASCAR Busch Series stock car race held at Nashville Speedway USA, in Nashville, Tennessee. The event returned the schedule in 1988, and again in 1989, after which it was removed a second time. The race returned to the Busch circuit yet again in 1995, this time the race distance being extended from 200 to 320 laps, now covering  in distance. The race remained on the Busch Series schedule for the next six seasons, but was removed a third and final time following the 2000 season.

Two other short tracks, Myrtle Beach Speedway and South Boston Speedway, were also removed from the Busch Series schedule after the 2000 season. This extra room created on the schedule was used to help add new races at Chicagoland Speedway, Kansas Speedway, Nashville Superspeedway, and Kentucky Speedway starting in 2001.

Past winners

References

External links
 

Former NASCAR races
NASCAR Xfinity Series races
 
Recurring sporting events established in 1984
Recurring sporting events disestablished in 2000
1984 establishments in Tennessee
2000 disestablishments in Tennessee